Sachin! Tendulkar Alla (English: Not Sachin Tendulkar) is a 2014 Indian Kannada film featuring Master Snehith, cricketers Javagal Srinath and Venkatesh Prasad, Suhasini Maniratnam and Sudharani. Directed by Mohan Shankar and produced by BN Gangadhar. This film is a non-commercial entertainer. Master Snehith plays the autistic boy who struggles to make it big in cricket. Suhasini Maniratnam plays his sister and Sudharani plays an important role. Rajesh Ramanath has composed the music. BN Gangadhar is the Producer of Sachin! Tendulkar Alla. The film was dubbed and released in Telugu as Sachin Tendulkar Kaadhu in 2015.

Cast
 Master Snehith as Sachin
  Javagal Srinath 
 Venkatesh Prasad as Cricket coach
  Suhasini Maniratnam as Sachin's elder sister 
 Sudharani

Reception 
A critic from Bangalore Mirror wrote that "Sachin - Tendulkar Alla is a feel-good film that manages to overwhelm a few senses". A critic from Deccan Chronicle rated the film  out of 5 and called the film "a master stroke which deserves some sort of 'record".

References

External links
 

2014 films
Films set in Bangalore
2010s Kannada-language films
Films shot in Bangalore
Indian children's films
Films about cricket in India
Films scored by Rajesh Ramnath
Films about autism
Sachin Tendulkar